Francesco Antonio Broccu (1797–1882), was an Italian artisan and inventor, born in Gadoni, Sardinia, regarded as the first developer of the revolver, realised by him in 1833.

He received a prize of 300 francs for his invention, but he did not patent it. His revolver was shown to the King Charles Albert of Sardinia in 1843. In 1835, a similar gun was patented by Samuel Colt.

Biography 
Born and living in Gadoni, a small town in Sardinia in the province of Nuoro, from childhood he showed a keen interest in mechanics, and he built many toys using materials such as reeds, wood and cork. He also built bronze bells and a wooden crucifix of excellent workmanship. He designed and built a craft watch and various mechanical tools for agricultural use.

References

1797 births
1882 deaths
19th-century Italian inventors
People from the Province of Nuoro